Introducing Three for All + One is the second album led by saxophonist Craig Handy which was recorded in 1993 and released on the Arabesque label.

Reception

The AllMusic review by Scott Yanow said "The improvisations are explorative yet melodic and logical, while the interplay between these talented players is consistently impressive. Together they explore tributes to Clifford Jordan and George Adams and at times hint at Coltrane, Sonny Rollins, and even Grover Washington, Jr.. ... recommended". On All About Jazz, Robert Dugan called it "another forward-looking set of music".

Track listing
All compositions by Craig Handy except where noted
 "Spinning Wheel" (David Clayton-Thomas) – 4:18
 "Isotope" (Joe Henderson) – 5:25
 "Bright Eyes" (Charles Fambrough) – 5:08
 "E Racer X" (Ralph Peterson) – 5:02
 "Chant" (Dave Kikoski) – 5:51
 "P.S. I Love You" (Gordon Jenkins, Johnny Mercer) – 3:32
 "Esnadtriuqs!" – 2:21
 "One!" (Marvin Hamlisch. Edward Kleban) – 5:50
 "Amy's Waltz" (Fambrough) – 3:50
 "The Avenue" (Fambrough) – 4:54
 "To Woo It May Concern" – 3:23
 "West Bank: Beyond the Berlin Wall" – 3:01

Personnel
Craig Handy – tenor saxophone
David Kikoski – piano (tracks 3, 5, 9 & 10)
Charles Fambrough – double bass
Ralph Peterson – drums

References

Arabesque Records albums
Craig Handy albums
1993 albums